Charles Wyndham Goodwyn  (11 March 1934 – 10 June 2015) was a British philatelist, and was Keeper of the Royal Philatelic Collection from September 1995 to January 2003. He was an expert in the philately of Hong Kong and China.

Organised philately
From 1991 to 1993, he served as president of the Royal Philatelic Society London (RPSL), of which he was elected Honorary Fellow in 1995.

Royal Philatelic Collection
In 1993, he was hired as assistant to John Marriott, the Keeper of the Royal Philatelic Collection. Since the constitution of this collection by King George V, it was the first time its curator was no more alone. In September 1995, Goodwyn replaced Marriott who retired from the post of Keeper.

As Keeper, Goodwyn continued his predecessors' tasks: to mount the British and Commonwealth collection sent by the postal administrations and the purchases made during George VI's and Elizabeth II's reigns, and to exhibit at international stamp shows.

He opened the Collection to postal historians or students whereas only members of the RPSL Expert Committee had regularly been allowed since the time of George V. When he sold in 2001, amongst duplicates, the collections of Egypt and of the Suez Canal to pay the 250.000 pounds for the Kirkcudbright cover, he reinforced the British Commonwealth specialization of the Royal Collection.

Like Marriott, he got assistants and that helped hurry the mounting of the George VI collection. In September 1996, Michael Sefi became adjoint to the Keeper after architect Surésh Dhargalkar was hired as an assistant in April 1996. Not a philatelist, the latter could however replaced Goodwyn and travelled with parts of the Collection to exhibition.

Weaker after an Australian exhibition in 1999 and the moving of the Royal Collection from Buckingham Palace to St. James's Palace around 2000, Goodwyn retired in January 2003 and was replaced by Sefi.

Outside philately
Goodwyn had the degree of LLB.

Honours and awards
 Lieutenant of the Royal Victorian Order in 2002.
 Knight of the Ordre de Saint-Charles in Monaco.
 Signed the Roll of Distinguished Philatelists.
 Smithsonian Philatelic Achievement Award in 2002.
 He received the Queen Elizabeth II Version of the Royal Household Long and Faithful Service Medal for 20 years of service to the British Royal Family in 2003.

Publications
 Royal Reform: postal reform 1837–1841 as reflected in the Royal Philatelic Collection, The Stuart Rossiter Trust, 2000.

References and sources
References

Sources
 Courtney, Nicholas (2004). The Queen's Stamps. The Authorised History of the Royal Philatelic Collection, éd. Methuen, 2004, .

1934 births
2015 deaths
British philatelists
Lieutenants of the Royal Victorian Order
Presidents of the Royal Philatelic Society London
Signatories to the Roll of Distinguished Philatelists